Mike Miklusak (born March 17, 1995) is an American professional basketball player who last played for Gries Oberhoffen.

Professional career
On July 15, 2017, Miklusak signed with New Heroes Den Bosch of the Dutch Basketball League (DBL).

References

External links
Western Illinois Leathernecks bio
2018 Dutch Basketball Kees Akerboom Trophy Winner (3 point shooter)

1994 births
Living people
American men's basketball players
Basketball players from Indiana
People from Lake County, Indiana
Small forwards
Heroes Den Bosch players
Dutch Basketball League players
Western Illinois Leathernecks men's basketball players